Time Out with Britney Spears (stylized in all lowercase) is the first video album by American recording artist Britney Spears. It was released on VHS on November 23, 1999 through Jive Records. The DVD version was released on December 14 of the same year. Time Out with Britney Spears was re-released on DVD in 2001, to coincide with the DVD release of Spears' second video Britney Spears: Live and More!.

Time Out with Britney Spears received generally favorable reviews from music critics. It was also a commercial success, topping the US Top Music Videos. It was certified triple platinum by the Recording Industry Association of America (RIAA).

Content 
Time Out with Britney Spears features interviews with Spears about her childhood, The Mickey Mouse Club, the making of her debut album ...Baby One More Time and life on tour. The video album also features the music videos for her singles "...Baby One More Time", "Sometimes" and "(You Drive Me) Crazy (The Stop Remix!)", as well as behind-the-scenes footage from each of them. Also included are live versions of "Born to Make You Happy" and "From the Bottom of My Broken Heart" from her Disney Channel special, a photo gallery that features a mixture of candid and professional shots, web site access and a trivia game that unlocks a special interview "if you answer all the questions correctly". There is an option for lyrics to appear on the screen when watching the music videos or the live performances.

Critical reception 
Time Out with Britney Spears received generally favorable reviews from music critics. Heather Phares of AllMusic called Time Out with Britney Spears "one of the better music DVDs currently available" and "a must for Britney enthusiasts". Marc Girdler of DVD Talk agreed, calling the release a "disc for Spears' fans", that is full of "everything you could want, within reason". Girdler wrote that the interview footage is "pretty good", although "most of it is taken from MTV, so the content is not all exclusive to the disc". The option of having lyrics appear on the screen is, according to Girdler, "cool if you like to sing along, but have a bad memory".

Commercial performance 
Time Out with Britney Spears debuted at number two on US Billboard Top Music Videos on December 18, 1999. After five weeks spent on the chart, the video reached number one. On June 15, 2000, Time Out with Britney Spears was certified triple platinum by the Recording Industry Association of America (RIAA), for shipments of over 300,000 copies, while remaining at number one on the chart on the dated week of June 24, 2000. The video made its last appearance on the dated week of March 24, 2001 at number thirty-seven, after staying on the chart for sixty-eight weeks.

Track listing 
 All music videos directed by Nigel Dick.

Charts

Certifications

References 

Britney Spears video albums
Jive Records live albums
Jive Records video albums
Live video albums
Britney Spears live albums
1999 live albums
1999 video albums